Dr. Zitbag's Transylvania Pet Shop (known as Dr. Globule in France) is a 1994-1997 animated television series created by Tony Barnes and produced by Philippe Mounier PMMP and Fairwater Films and distributed in the UK by The Sleepy Kids Company Ltd (who also produced Potsworth & Co. and Budgie the Little Helicopter) which was later changed to SKD Media and Entertainment Rights and then dissolved into Classic Media (now DreamWorks Classics) and by PMMP and TF1 Intl in the rest of the world. 65 episodes were produced.

The show originally aired on TF1 and it was later dubbed for English audiences as well; even the show's title got a name change. It aired in the United Kingdom on ITV; starting 13 June 1994 and finishing 21 August 1997, the show ran for four series. Music for the series was composed by Danny Chang and Tony Barnes.

A comic strip version of the show was included in Buster magazine from September 1994 to November 1996. The series was later repeated on Nickelodeon in the early 2000s until 2004, and had sporadic reruns on ordinary TV from 1999 until 2001 (it was put on hiatus in 2002).

It was also aired on cable television in Australia first airing on Nickelodeon and later on Cartoon Network.

Plot summary
Dr. Zitbag was a Pet Shop worker who wasn't very good at selling any pets at all and because of this he was fired from the local Transylvanian Pet Shop. So he decides to set up his own Pet Shop at an old Haunted Castle and finds out that he will have to share the place with a skeleton dog, Horrifido. With Horrifido now helping him out, the doctor begins use with his inventions to create Horrific Pets to gain his profit.

Characters
Dr. Sidney Zitbag (voiced by Christian Rodska) - The main character of the show, he is a mad scientist type of character who wants to become the world's best pet shop owner. After being fired from the only town pet shop he goes on to buy an old castle from the Exorsisters and sets up his own pet shop creating new and weird pets in his laboratory, but his plans don't always work and certain mishaps do tend to happen.
Horrifido (voiced by Kerry Shale) - Horrifido, or Fido as he was known in life, was the pet dog of the former owner of the old castle (Capt. Charles de Ghoul) where Dr. Zitbag sets up his pet shop. Initially haunting the castle as a ghost, the doctor inadvertently uncovers the dog's old bones and the ghoul reanimates them, giving him a physical form. Horrifido is thus a skeleton dog with green bat winged like ears, who becomes Dr. Zitbag's assistant. Sometimes Horrifido is seen wearing a pink bow collar around his neck.
The Exorsisters (voiced by Nicolette McKenzie) - The Exorsisters are Dr. Zitbag's neighbours. Both ladies are twins resembling the bride of Frankenstein. Every so often, Dr. Zitbag always tries to impress them both, but the two often argue with each other. Sinista, the sister with purple streaks in her hair, often dismisses Dr. Zitbag, whereas Bimbella, the sister with white streaks in her hair, is more willing to give him a chance.
Zombunny - Zombunny appears to be a zombified rabbit who never seems to move. Most of the time, he is seen with Dr. Zitbag and Horrifido, as Dr. Zitbag would use Zombunny as part of his experiments. Zitbag would often throw him aside while saying a cursory "Excuse me, Zombunny".
Officer Deadbeat (voiced by Kerry Shale) - Officer Deadbeat is the local police officer of Transylvania and Zitbag's antagonist. He appears to have no neck and so his head is floating at where his would be neck should be. He has a personal grudge against Dr. Zitbag, believing that the doctor is a con-artist. If he ever arrests the doctor for good, his ultimate goal is to claim the old Haunted House as a new police station, as the one he has got is very small and he often bumps his head off.
Professor Sherman Vermin (voiced by Kerry Shale) - Zitbag's rival. Sinistra and Bimbella sometimes call him to help them, eventually making Dr. Zitbag jealous.

List of episodes
Twelve of a total of 65 episodes were released on video.

Series One (Mondays)
 Welcome To The Transylvania Pet Shop - first aired: 20/06/1994 (the pilot episode of the show)
 Grime Does Not Pay - first aired: 27/06/1994
There was no episode broadcast on 04/07/1994 due to a showing of Dragonslayer as a result of schedule changes regarding the 1994 FIFA World Cup.
 Horrybaby - first aired: 11/07/1994
 Food Glorious Pet Food - first aired: 18/07/1994
 Ants In Your Pants - first aired: 25/07/1994
 Every Dog Has Its Show - first aired: 01/08/1994
 Gorilla Thriller - first aired: 08/08/1994
 Where Mouse - first aired: 15/08/1994
 Pirate Parrots - first aired: 22/08/1994
There was no episode shown on 29/08/1994 due to it being public holiday.
 Bungle in the Jungle - first aired: 05/09/1994
 Halloween Horse Race - first aired: 12/09/1994
 Double Trouble - first aired: 19/09/1994
 Triassic Lark - first aired: 26/09/1994 - The children were demanding dinosaurs for pets, which caused Dr. Zitbag and Horrifido to construct a time machine in order to travel to prehistoric times so to capture some baby dinosaurs. After minor setbacks such as travelling to before creation and the future, they have arrived, unbeknownst that Officer Deadbeat had snuck on board and had his hijinks with a cavewoman. This is the first episode (also applies to every episode beyond) that was only broadcast and never commercially released.

Series Two (Fridays)
 Inspectre Spector - first aired: 09/06/1995
 Pyramid Pandemonium - first aired: 16/06/1995
 Computer Bugged - first aired: 23/06/1995
 Kangaroo Caught - first aired: 30/06/1995
 Orang-Utans and Lemmings - first aired: 07/07/1995
 Medieval Dread - first aired: 14/07/1995
 Easter Funny - first aired: 21/07/1995
 Happy Horridays - first aired: 28/07/1995
 Transylvania Excess - first aired: 04/08/1995
 Do You Believe in Humans? - first aired: 11/08/1995 
 Loch Mess Monster - first aired: 18/08/1995
 Hooray for Horrywood - first aired: 25/08/1995
 The Show Mustn't Go On - first aired: 01/09/1995

Series Three (Tuesdays)
 Don't Hoot, I'm Only the Piano Slayer - first aired: 11/06/1996
 Pinball Wizard - first aired: 18/06/1996
 From Transylvania with Love - first aired: 25/06/1996
 Tele Nightmare - first aired: 02/07/1996
 A Close Shave - first aired: 09/07/1996
 Lost Wages - first aired: 16/07/1996
 Son of Zitbag - first aired: 23/07/1996
 Cranksgiving Chaos - first aired: 30/07/1996
 Bride of Horrifido - first aired: 06/08/1996
 Horrorgrammes Horrolympics - first aired: 13/08/1996
 Slime Suspect - first aired: 20/08/1996
 Moby Duck Billed Platypus - first aired: 27/08/1996
 I Was a Teenage Zitbag - first aired: 03/09/1996

Series Four (Thursdays)
 A True Fairy Tale - first aired: 29/05/1997
 For Better or For Curse - first aired: 05/06/1997
 Horrorlection Fever - first aired: 12/06/1997
 Time is Big Money - first aired: 19/06/1997
 Happy Mishmash - first aired: 26/06/1997
 Tele-Zitportation - first aired: 03/07/1997
 A Giant Problem - first aired: 10/07/1997
 My Zister - first aired: 17/07/1997
 The Seventh Art - first aired: 24/07/1997
 Nothing There - first aired: 31/07/1997
 Doc, What's Up - first aired: 07/08/1997
 Terror in Transylvania - first aired: 14/08/1997
 Dances the Hula - first aired: 21/08/1997

Unaired episodes

The following episodes never aired on CITV.

 End of Season
 Rose Button
 Scare Tactics
 Hydrious Monster
 Zlotys Galore
 Bluebald
 Dr. Zitbag Against Silly Holmes
 Mad Scientific Shenanigans
 The Ridiculous Journey
 Horrible Horrorscopes
 Anarchic Arctic Antics
 Word of Horror
 Forever Fiends

Transylvania Pet Shop is currently one of the most requested unreleased DVDs at TVShowsOnDVD.com.

Season 1 is currently available for download (In English) from Amazon UK.

In other languages

References

External links
 Retro Junk
 
 
 
 PMMP Philppe Mounier Marketing Production
 

British children's animated comedy television series
British children's animated horror television series
1994 British television series debuts
1997 British television series endings
1990s British children's television series
Carlton Television
DreamWorks Classics
Television series by Universal Television
ITV children's television shows
Nickelodeon original programming
Television series by ITV Studios
English-language television shows
1990s British animated television series